Ragna Berget Jørgensen (born 19 November 1941 in Skogn) is a Norwegian politician for the Labour Party.

Jørgensen was a member of Bodø city council between 1979 and 1983. She was elected to the Norwegian Parliament from Nordland in 1981, and was re-elected on three occasions.

She resides at Evje, Akershus.

References

1941 births
Living people
Labour Party (Norway) politicians
Women members of the Storting
Members of the Storting
20th-century Norwegian politicians
20th-century Norwegian women politicians
People from Levanger